This is an alphabetical list of Hindi songs performed by Udit Narayan from 
1980 to date. Over 1200 songs are listed here.

1980s

1980

1981

1982

1983

1984

1985

1986

1987

1988

1989

1990s

1990

1991

1992

1993

1994

1995

1996

1997

1998

1999

2000s

2000

2001

2002

2003

2004

2005

2006

2007

2008

2009

2010–Present

Non-film Songs

Hindi Television songs

See also
Udit Narayan
Bollywood selected discography of Udit Narayan
Abhijeet Bhattacharya Discography
Sonu Nigam discography
List of songs recorded by Amit Kumar
List of songs recorded by Kishore Kumar
List of songs recorded by Alka Yagnik
List of songs recorded by Mohammed Rafi (T)
List of songs recorded by Anuradha Paudwal

References

External links
 
 Udit Narayan Songs: Dhingana
 Udit Narayan All Song's On YouTube

Udit Narayan
Hindi songs
Narayan